The Ottoman Military College or Imperial Military Staff College or Ottoman Army War College ( or 
), was a two-year military staff college of the Ottoman Empire. It was located in Constantinople (now Istanbul). Its mission was to educate staff officers for the Ottoman Army.

Facilities
In the Ottoman Military Academy in Pangaltı, Şişli (1848–1953)
Taşkışla, Şişli (1853–1858), today the administrative building of the Istanbul Technical University
In the Gülhane Military Hospital, Fatih (1858–1862)
Pangaltı, Şişli (1862 – October 1909)
The apartment of princes in Yıldız Palace, Beşiktaş (1909–1914), today Yıldız Technical University
Çağlayan Kiosk, Kağıthane (for three months in 1917)
Şerif Paşa Konağı, Teşvikiye, Şişli (February 28, 1919 – April 1, 1921)

Graduates of the Ottoman Military College

1st - 36th classes
1st class (graduated in July 1849)
Hussein Avni Pasha, Isparta, 1820, Müşir
Mahmud Mesud Pasha, Amasya, 1820, Müşir
Mustafa Sidki Pasha, Soma, ?, Müşir (governor)
Mustafa Saffet Pasha, Karagümrük, ?, Müşir (governor)
Sabit Bey, Cyprus, ?, Miralay

2nd class (graduated in 1851)
Mehmed Pasha, Aksaray, ?, Ferik
Arif Pasha, Hocapaşa, ?, Müşir
Rifat Pasha, Constantinople, ?, Mirliva
Mehmed Rauf Pasha, Constantinople, 1832, Müşir

3rd class (graduated in 1852)
Ali Saib Pasha, Kayseri, ?, Müşir
Tahir Pasha, Beşiktaş, ?, Ferik
Ali Nizami Pasha, Gerede, 1821, Müşir
Eshref Pasha, Zeyrek, ?, Ferik
Cafer Pasha (Skadar sancaği, Gosina kazasi)1830, Ferik

4th class (graduated in 1853)
Suleiman Pasha, Eyüp, ?, Ferik
Hasan Samih Pasha, Eyüp, ?, Müşir (governor)
Nuri Pasha, ?, ?, Mirliva

5th class (graduated in 1854)
Hussein Husnu Pasha, Kasımpaşa, 1829, Müşir
Mehmed Ali Pasha, Magdeburg, 1829, Müşir (KIA)
Osman Nuri Pasha, Tokat, 1833, Müşir

6th class (graduated in 1855)
Tahsin Bey, Galata, ?, Kaymakam
Ahmed Fazil Pasha, Cerrahpaşa, ?, Ferik (KIA)

7th class (graduated in 1856)
Mehmed Munib Pasha, Kayseri, ?, Mirliva
Omer Naili Pasha, Constantinople, 1831, Mirliva
Hafiz Ismail Hakki Pasha, Bosnia, ?, Mirliva
Ibrahim Pasha, Sarıgüzel, ?, Mirliva
Nedjib Pasha, Cihangir, ?, Mirliva (ambassador)

8th class (graduated in 1857)
Ibrahim Pasha, Süleymaniye, ?, Ferik
Ibrahim Edhem Pasha, Davutpaşa, 1835, Müşir
Tahir Pasha, Paramakkapı, 1832, Müşir

9th class (graduated in 1858)
Ahmed Esad Pasha, Sakız, 1826, Müşir
Hasan Rushdi Pasha, Adrianople (now Edirne), ?, Müşir
Ahmed Munir Bey, Doğancılar, ?, Kolağası
Mehmed Riza Pasha, Hocapaşa, ?, Mirliva
Said Pasha, Bursa, ?, Mirliva
Mehmed Rashid Bey, Monastır, Miralay (KIA)
Mehmed Shevki Bey, Monastır, Kolağası
Kiazim Bey, ?, ?, Miralay

37th - 54th classes

46th class (graduated on March 20, 1894)

Ömer Fevzi, Davutpaşa, ?, ?, Albay
Cevat, Doğancılar, ?, ?, Albay
Raşit Galip Dozar, Yanya, ?, Albay
Mehmet Şerif, Damascus, ?, ?, ?
Ali Rıza Sedes, Sultanahmet, 1307 P-6, Tuğgeneral
İ. Cevat Şakir Çobanlı, Sultanahmet, 1870, 1307 P-4, Orgeneral
Abbas, Tahmasp, ?, ?, ?
Ziya, Yanya, ?, ?, Albay
Behzat, Constantinople, ?, ?, Albay

47th class (graduated on March 13, 1895)

Mehmet Ali, Bosnia, ?, 1308 P-5, Korgeneral
Mahmut Beliğ, Beylerbeyi, ?, 1308 P-6, Albay
Neş'et, Küçük Mustafa Paşa, ?, ?, Tuğgeneral
Nuri, Trabzon, ?, ?, Albay
Mehmet Zeki, Emirgan, ?, 1308 P-1, Albay
Hasan Rıza, Constantinople, 1871, ?, Tuğgeneral (KIA)
Osman Senai, Monastir (now Bitola, North Macedonia), ?, ?, Albay
Mehmet Rasim, Monastir, ?, ?, Albay
Ömer Kâni, Süleymaniye, ?, ?, Yarbay
Mehmet Ali, Iran, ?, ?, ?
Sabri, Şumnu, ?, ?, Albay
Hâmit, Iran, ?, ?, ?
Hasan Sadettin, Balçık, ?, ?, Yarbay
Osman Nuri, Selimiye, ?, 1309 Top-1, Albay

48th class (graduated on January 28, 1896)

Mehmet Şükrü, Antep, ?, 1309 Sv-1, Albay
Paşa Bora, Akyürek, Yozgat, ?, 1309 Sv-1, Albay
Ethem, Şehzadebaşı, ?, 1309 Sv-1, Albay
Arif, Çengelköy, ?, 1309 P-5, Albay (governor)
Feyzullah, Beylerbeyi, ?, 1309 P-4, Albay
Yusuf Ziya, Damascus, ?, 1309 P-3, Albay
Mehmet Suphi, Çarşamba, ?, 1310 Top-1, Albay (KIA)
Cemalettin, Bakırköy, ?, ?, Albay
Cevdet, Baghdad, ?, 1309 P-7, Albay
Şükrü, Yenibahçe, ?, ?, Albay
Ahmed Ahmet Cemal, Çengelköy, 1872, ?, Korgeneral
İhsan, Mollagürani, ?, 1309 P-6, Tuğgeneral
Mustafa, Tırnova, ?, ?, Albay
Mustafa Hilmi, Malatya, ?, 1309 P-8, Albay
Sermet, Beylerbeyi, ?, 1309 P-9, Tuğgeneral
Halit, ?, ?, ?, Tuğgeneral
Ahmet Nuri Diriker, Rusçuk, 1876, 1312-P-23, Brigadier General 
Tahir, ?, ?, ?, Yüzbaşı

49th class (graduated on March 16, 1897)

Mehmet Vahit, Aksaray, ?, ?, Binbaşı
Hüseyin Necati, Bursa, ?, 1310 P-9, Albay
İsmail Hakkı, Filibe, ?, 1310 P-4, Albay
Ali Şevki, Monastir, ?, ?, Yarbay
Halil Recai, Monastir, ?, 1310 P-8, Albay
Tevfik, Erzurum, ?, 1310 P-3, Albay
Ahmet Refik, Constantinople, ?, ?, Albay
Hasan Basri, Sivas, ?, 1311 Top-1, Albay
Mustafa Hamdi, Silistre, ?, ?, Yarbay
Mustafa Reha, Batum, ?, 1310 Sv-2, Albay
Süleyman Şakir, Trebizond (now Trabzon), ?, 1310 P-5, Albay
Ali Kemal, Constantinople, ?, 1310 P-7, Tuğgeneral
İbrahim Ethem, Trebizond, ?, ?, Yüzbaşı

50th class (graduated on January 24, 1898)

Ferit Cemal Mersinli, Mersin, ?, ?, Tümgeneral
Salih, Bursa, ?, 1311 P-b-10, Albay
Mehmet Fehmi, Baghdad, ?, ?, Tümgeneral
Halil İbrahim Sedes, Sultanahmet, ?, ?, Tümgeneral
Süreyya İlmen, Constantinople, 1874, ?, Tuğgeneral
Ali, Bakırköy, ?, 1311 P-b-11, Yarbay
Zekeriya, Daghestan, ?, ?, Yarbay
Hafız Rifat, Vidin, ?, ?, Yarbay
Mehmet, Çarşamba, ?, ?, Binbaşı (KIA)
Ali Riza, Pazarcık, ?, 1311 P-b-9, Tuğgeneral
Ahmet Avni, Batum, ?, ?, Albay
Ragıp, Batum, ?, ?, Yarbay
Mehmet Nuri, Çarşamba, ?, ?, Yarbay
Ali, Bosna, ?, ?, 1311 P-b-6, Albay
Ali Remzi, Erzurum, ?, 1311 P-c-1, Yarbay
Hafız Ali, Harput, ?, ?, Binbaşı
Ali Galip, Kayseri, 1871, ?, Albay (governor)

51st class (graduated on December 25, 1898)

Behçet, Sultanselim, ?, 1311 P-c-2, Albay
Hilmi, Manisa, ?, ?, Yarbay
Celâlettin, Aksaray, ?, 1311 P-c-5, Albay
Vehbi, Servi, ?, 1311 P-c-5, Tuğgeneral
Bedri, Nişantaşı, ?, 1311 P-c-13, Yarbay
Halil, Davutpaşa, ?, ?, Yarbay
Yusuf Rasin, Batum, ?, ?, Yarbay
Hasan Vasfi, Bosnia, ?, 1311 P-c-11, Albay
Abdülkerim, Selânik, ?, 1311 P-c-9, Albay
M. Adil, Köstendil, ?, ?, 1311 P-c-15, Yarbay (KIA)
Ali Rıza, Köstendil, ?, ?, Kolağası
Kâzım Kıvılcım, Kemah, ?, 1311 P-c-14, Tümgeneral (governor)
Mustafa Fevzi Çakmak, Rumelikavağı, ?, 1311 P-c-7, Mareşal
Ali Sait Akbaytogan, Balıkesir, ?, 1311 P-c-1, Orgeneral
Saffet, Bursa, ?, ?, Binbaşı
Hayrettin, Nişantaşı, ?, ?, Yarbay
Yusuf Ziya, Şehzadebaşı, ?, 1312 Top-1, Yarbay
Zihni, Çiftesaray, ?, ?, Yarbay

52nd class (graduated on January 17, 1900)

Nihat Anılmış, Filibe, ?, 1312 P-4, Korgeneral
Ali Ruşen, Görüce, ?, 1312 P-7, Albay
Sadık Sabri, Monastir, ?, 1312 P-1, Albay
Yusuf Izzet, Yozgat, 1312 P-6, Tümgeneral
Yakup Şevki Subaşı, Mamuretülaziz (now Elazığ), ?, 1312 P-5, Orgeneral
Ahmet İhsan, Cyprus, ?, 1312 P-8, Albay
Süleyman Fethi, Scutari (now Üsküdar) in Constantinople, ?, 1312 P-10, Albay (KIA)
İbrahim Habi, Serez, ?, ?, Binbaşı
Hasan Cemil Çambel, Üsküdar, 1312 P-2, Albay 
Refet, Constantinople, ?, 1312 P-13, Albay
Ahmet Zeki, Constantinople, ?, ?, Albay
Muhittin, Damascus, ?, 1312 P-14, Albay
Mustafa Nimet, Aleppo, ?, 1312 P-18, Albay
Esat, Beirut, ?, ?, Binbaşı
Mehmet Vehip Kaçı, Yanya Top.1313-c-1, Korgeneral
Ahmet Faik, 1313 Top-c-2, Tümgeneral (KIA)

53rd class (graduated on February 2, 1901)

Ahmet Agâh Perin, ?, ?, ?, Yarbay
Cemil, Halıcılar, ?, ?, Kolağası
M. Nuri, Şumnu, ?, ?, Albay
Refet, Taşkasap, ?, 1313 P-9, Tuğgeneral
Ali Remzi, Selânik, ?, 1313 P-11, Tuğgeneral
Rüştü, Sultanselim, ?, ?, Binbaşı
Şükrü Bey, Şehzadebaşı, ?, 1313 P-14, Albay
Musa Kâzım Tunç, Afyonkarahisar, ?, 1313 P-18, Albay
Hüseyin Kadri, Bandırma, ?, ?, Binbaşı
Mustafa, Köstendil, ?, ?, Tuğgeneral
Hasan Basri Tosun, Dimetoka, ?, 1313 Sv-1, Albay
Mustafa Asım, Bosnia, ?, 1313 P-8, Yarbay
İsmail Hakkı, Priştine, ?, ?, Binbaşı (governor)
M. Nuri, Eruzrum, ?, ?, Yüzbaşı
Hafız Zühtü Yar, Fındıklı, ?, 1313 Sv-5, Yarbay
M. Sadeddin, Serez, ?, ?, Binbaşı (KIA)
Cemal, Erzurum, ?, ?, Binbaşı
Ali Rıza, Elazığ, ?, 1313 P-2, Yarbay
İskender Hakkı, Kuşadası, ?, ?, Binbaşı
Salih Zeki, Kızanlık, ?, ?, Yarbay (KIA)

54th class (graduated on January 9, 1902)

Behiç Erkin, Constantinople, 1876, ?, Albay (ambassador)
Mustafa İffet, Constantinople, ?, ?, ?
Bahaddin, Bursa, ?, 1314 P-4, Albay
Refik Uran, Kadıköy, ?, 1314 P-5, Yarbay
Mehmet Selâhattin, Bâbıali, ?, 1314 P-7, Albay
Hüseyin Selâhattin Köseoğlu, Bâbıali, ?, 1314 P-9, Albay
Mehmet Sait Kozoğlu, Divrik, ?, 1314–18, Yarbay
Osman Şevki Eskin, Defterdar, ?, 1314 P-27, Tümgeneral
Hamdi, Trabzon, ?, ?, Albay
Ahmet Nizamettin, Constantinople, ?, ?, Binbaşı
Adem Vasfi, Manastır, ?, 1314 P-22, Albay
Şükrü Naili Gökberk, Selânik, 1876, 1314 P-13, Korgeneral
Şefik, Odabaşı, ?, 1314 P-20, Tuğgeneral
İrfan Durukan, Kasımpaşa, ?, 1314 P-10, Albay
Ömer Lütfi, Fatih, ?, 1314 P-3, Albay
Ali Rıza, Kayseri, ?, ?, Yüzbaşı
Aziz Samih, Tophane, ?, ?, Albay
Abdurrahman, Mudanya, ?, 1314 P-21, Albay
Ali Hikmet Ayerdem, Yenişehir, 1877, 1314 P-16, Korgeneral
Kemalettin, Kassamçeşme, ?, 1314, P-12, Yarbay
Halit, Kandilli, ?, ?, Yüzbaşı
Ömer Lütfi, Yenibahçe, 1314 P-2, Albay
M. Ali, Aksaray, ?, ?, Yarbay
Mustafa Asım, İzmit, 1314 Sv-1, Yarbay
M. Ferit, Erzurum, ?, ?, Yarbay (KIA)
Selim, Damascus, ?, ?, Yarbay
Mustafa Hamdi, Üsküp, ?, 1315 Ağ.Top-1, Yarbay
Ali Fıtrî, Sivas, ?, 1315 Top-2, Albay
Şerif, Köprülü, ?, 1315 Top-1, Yarbay
Mehmet Tevfik, Kerkük, ?, 1313 P-2, Albay
Süreyya, Sarıgez, ?, ?, Yarbay

55th - 67th classes

55th class (graduated on December 5, 1902)

Staff (kurmay) officers
Hafız Hakkı, Manastır, ?, 1315 P-2, Tuğgeneral
Enver, IConstantinople, 1881. 1315 P-4, Korgeneral
Fuat, Harkaişerif, ?, ?, Binbaşı
Mahmud Kâmil, Aleppo, 1315 P-8, Tümgeneral
Mehmet Selâhattin Âdil, Koca Mustafa Paşa, 1316 Top-b-2, Tümgeneral
İsmail Hakkı Erdener, Fındıklı, 1316 Top-1, Tümgeneral
Fahrettin Altay, ?, Smyrna (now Izmir), 1315 P-1, Orgeneral
Sabit, Antep, ?, ?, Binbaşı
Ahmet Kemal, Gelibolu, ?, ?, Binbaşı
M. Nuri, Selânik, ?, ?, Binbaşı
Emrullah, Trabzon, ?, 1315 P-9, Yarbay
Kâzım İnanç, ?, ?, 1315 P-29, Tümgeneral (governor)

Distinguished (mümtaz) officers
Irfan, Manastır, ?, 1315 Sv-1, Binbaşı
Ahmed Hamdi, Çemişgezek, ?, ?, Yüzbaşı
Hüsnü, Mustafa Paşa, ?, ?, Yüzbaşı
Bekir Sami Günsav, Bandırma, ?, 1315 P-17, Albay
Mehmet Adil, Trabzon, ?, 1315 P-13, Albay
Ahmet Muhtar, Manisa, ?, 1315 P-20, Yarbay
Kasım, Edirne, ?, ?, ?
Vahit, Damascus, ?, ?, Yarbay
İbrahim Ethem, Damascus, ?, 1315 P-37, Binbaşı
Hafız İsmail, Safranbolu, ?, ?, Binbaşı
Asım, Kavak, ?, ?, Binbaşı
Hilmi, Sarıyer, ?, ?, ?
Rüştü, Şehzadebaşı, ?, ?, Binbaşı
Ziya, Edirne, ?, ?, Tuğgeneral
Cemal, Damascuc, ?, 1315 P-24, Binbaşı
Şevket, Malatya, ?, ?, Binbaşı
Veli, Pazarcık, ?, ?, Yarbay
Emin, Trabzon, 1315 P-21, Yarbay
Süleyman İlhami, Filibe, ?, 1315 P-14, Albay (KIA)
Ahmet Nuri Öztekin, Balıkesir, 1876, 1315 P-26, Albay
Ethem Servet Boral, Caucasus, 1876, 1315 P-16, Albay
Fethi, Sarıgez, ?, 1315 P-18, Yarbay
Ahmet Tevfik, Antalya, ?, 1315 P-32, Binbaşı
Tevfik, Süleymaniye, ?, ?, Binbaşı

56th class (graduated on January 4, 1904)

Staff (kurmay) officers
Ali Fethi Okyar, Pirlepe, 1880, 1316 P-1, Binbaşı (ambassador)
Ali Fuat Erden, Taşkasap, 1884, 1316 Top-1, Korgeneral
Ali Mümtaz, Haseki, ?, 1316 P-3, Yarbay
Hafiz Cemil, Prizren, ?, 1316 P-4, Yarbay
Emin Lütfi, Damascus, ?, 1316 P-5, Binbaşı
Ahmet Muhtar, Çengelköy, 1877, ?, Binbaşı (KIA)
Şevket, Galata, 1881, 1316 Sv-3, Albay
Hayri, Konya, ?, ?, Yarbay
Cafer Tayyar Eğilmez, Priştine, 1877, 1316 Sv-4, Tümgeneral
İsmail Hakkı, Baghdad, ?, 1316 P-9, Yarbay

Distinguished (mümtaz) officers
Kara Vasıf, Constantinople, ?, 1316 P-13, Albay
Necimettin, Kadıköy, ?, ?, Kolağası
Emin, Söke, ?, ?, Kolağası (KIA)
Habib, Bolu, ?, ?, Kolağası
Ahmet Sabih, Baghdad, ?, ?, Yarbay (ambassador)
Mustafa Asım, Köstendil, 1316 P-51, Binbaşı
Mustafa Muğlalı, Muğla, ?, 1316 P-21, Orgeneral
Haydar, Constantinople, ?, 1316 Sv-5, Albay
M. Zekeriye, Damascus, ?, 1316 P-24, Yarbay
Hayri, Koca Mustafa Paşa, ?, 1316 P-12, Binbaşı
Abdülaziz, Kahire, ?, ?, Binbaşı
Mustafa, Selânik, ?, 1316 P-20, Binbaşı
Abdülhamit, Baghdad, ?, ?, Binbaşı
Mehmet Fuat, Diyarbakır, ?, ?, Kolağası
Mehmet, Edirne, ?, 1316 Sv-6, Yarbay
Hasan Talât, Çukurçeşme, ?, ?, Binbaşı
Mürsel Bakû, Erzurum, 1316 Sv-18, Binbaşı
Ömer Lütfi Argeşo, Şehzadebaşı, 1879, 1316 P-25, Yarbay
Şemsettin, Damascus, ?, 1316 P-18, Binbaşı
Behram, Çarşamba, ?, 1316 P-23, Yarbay
Akif, Hacıkadın, ?, ?, Yarbay
İzzet, Mollahüsrev, ?, 1316 P-26, Tuğgeneral

57th class (graduated on January 11, 1905)

Staff (kurmay) officers
Ali İhsan Sâbis, Cihangir, ?, 1317 Top-1, Tümgeneral
Asım Gündüz, Kütahya, ?, 1316 P-2, Orgenearl
Ahmet Sedat Doğruer, Üsküdar, 1882, 1317 P-30, Korgeneral
Ahmet Tevfik, Selânik, ?, ?, Yüzbaşı
Mustafa Kemal Atatürk, Selânik, 1881, 1317 P-8, Müşir
Mehmet Hayri Tarhan, Davutpaşa, ?, 1317 P-4, Tümgeneral
Mustafa İzzet, Çanakkale, ?, ?, Albay
Ali Seydi, Rumeli Kavağı, ?, 1317 Top-2, Albay
Ali Fuat Cebesoy, Salacak, 1883, 1317 P-28, Korgeneral (ambassador)
Süleyman Şevket, Izmir, 1317 İs-1, Yarbay (ambassador)
Kemal Ohri, Ohri, 1317 P-18, Yarbay
M. Şevki, Kıztaşı, ?, ?, Binbaşı
Ahmet Müfit Özdeş, ?, ?, 1317 P-9, Yarbay

Distinguished (mümtaz) officers
Cemil Uybadın, Süleymaniye, ?, 1317 P-6, Yarbay
Mehmet Emin, Süleymaniye, ?, 1317 P-23, Binbaşı
Cavit Erdel, Edirne, ?, 1317 P-14, Tuğgeneral
Hamit Fahri, Çerkeş, ?, 1317 Sv-4, Yarbay (KIA)
Halil Kut, Yenimahalle, ?, ?, Tümgeneral
Mehmet Arif, Adana, ?, 1317 P-17, Albay
Abdi Pandır, Kasımpaşa, ?, 1317 P-16, Tümgeneral
Osman Nuri, Manisa, ?, 1317 P-3, Yarbay
Mustafa Galip Deniz, İnebolu, 1317 P-25, Korgeneral
Ali Şevket, Üsküp, ?, ?, Kolağası
İsmail Hakkı, Köprülü, 1317 Top-44, Binbaşı
Hasan Zeki, Varna, ?, 1317 P-12, Binbaşı
Süleyman İzzet, Damascus, ?, 1317 Sv-1, Yarbay
Ahmet Faik Erner, Bursa, ?, ?, Albay (governor)
Selim, Çerkeş, ?, ?, Yüzbaşı (KIA)
Mehmet Ali Nasman, Lâleli, ?, 1317 P-29, Binbaşı
Ali, Trabzon, ?, ?, Yüzbaşı
Ahmet Zeki, Süleymaniye, ?, 1317 P-27, Yüzbaşı
Halil Rifat, Trabzon, ?, 1317 P-1, Yarbay
Hüseyin Hüsnü, Kastamonu, ?, 1317 P-26, Binbaşı
Ahmet Suat Ener, Saraçhanebaşı, 1317 P-19, Yarbay
Mehmet Arif, Constantinople, 1317 Sv-5, Binbaşı
Bekir Lütfi, Constantinople, ?, ?, Yarbay (governor)
Fuat, Aksaray, ?, ?, Yarbay

58th class (graduated on November 5, 1905)

Staff (kurmay) officers
Reşit, Cerrahpaşa, ?, 1318 P-4, Albay
Ali Fehmi, Trablusgarp, ?, 1318 P-1, Binbaşı
Hüseyin Hüsnü Alpdoğan, Taşköprü, ?, 1310 P-12, Korgeneral (governor)
Halil Rüştü, Damascus, ?, 1318 P-3, Binbaşı
Ahmet, Damascus, ?, 1318 P-6, Binbaşı
Ahmet Sırrı, Aleppo, ?, ?, Kolağası
Hilmi, Kastamonu, ?, ?, Kolağası
Kâzım Karabekir, Zeyrek, 1882, 1318 P-1, Korgeneral
Sadullah Güney, Galata, ?, 1318 Kale Top-1, Albay
Kadri Demirkaya, Çukurçeşme, ?, 1318 İs-1, Tümgeneral
Emin Koral, Halıcıoğlu, ?, 1318 Ağ.Top-1, Korgeneral
Nasuhi, Damascus, 1318 P-7, Albay
Yahya Hayati, Damascus, 1318 P-2, Albay
M. Tahir, Elazığ, 1318 P-8, Binbaşı (KIA)
Yasin Hilmi, Baghdad, 1318 P-18, Tuğgeneral

Distinguished (mümtaz) officers
Salim Cevat Ayalp, Lâleli, ?, 1318 P-13, Tümgeneral
Osman Behçet, Balıkesir, ?, 1318 Top-3, Albay
Ali, Damascus, ?, 1318 P-23, Binbaşı
Nuri, Toptaşı, ?, 1318 P-27, Yarbay
Adem Safi, Hamidiye, ?, ?, Yüzbaşı
Seyfi Düzgören, Firuzağa, ?, 1318 P-14, Tümgeneral
Mustafa Kâmil, Kerkük, ?, 1318 P-30, Binbaşı
Süleyman, Isparta, 1318 P-22, Albay
Mehmet Nuri Conker, Selânik, 1318 P-15, Albay
Kadri Alkoç, Etyemez, ?, ?, Albay
Süleyman Askeri, Prizren, ?, ?, Yarbay (KIA)
Kâzım Özalp, Köprülü, 1880, 1318 P-29, Orgeneral
Halil, Prizren, 1318 Sv-2, Yarbay
Mustafa Asım, Bosnia, ?, ?, Binbaşı (KIA)
Emin, Fatih, ?, ?, Yarbay (KIA)
Ethem Necdet Karabudak, Aydın, ?, ?, Albay
Hidayet, Zeyrek, ?, 1312 P-10, Yarbay
Ahmet Pertev, Seniçe, ?, 1318 Sv-5, Binbaşı
İbrahim Ethem, Damascus, ?, 1318 P-38, Binbaşı
Ahmet Hulûsi, Küçük Ayasofya, ?, ?, Yüzbaşı (KIA)
Mehmet Ali, Serez, ?, ?, Yüzbaşı
Ahmet Muhtar, Haseki, ?, ?, Albay
Remzi, Hisar, 1318 P-35, Binbaşı (KIA)
Mehmet Halit, zincirlikuyu, ?, ?, Albay
Ali Suat Ucur, Nişantaşı, ?, 1318 P-36, Binbaşı
Mehmet Hulûsi Conk, Izmir, ?, 1318 P-24, Albay
Hasan Tahsin, Damascus, ?, ?, Yüzbaşı
Enis, Erzincan, ?, ?, Albay
Fikri, Tarsus, ?, 1318 P-26, Binbaşı

59th class (graduated on September 20, 1907)

Staff (kurmay) officers
Alâettin Koval, Kasımpaşa, ?, 1319 P-7, Tümgeneral
Hasan Ruşen, Crete, ?, ?, Kolağası
Hürrem, Kars, ?, ?, Yarbay
Ali Hayri Ezer, Beylerbeyi, 1319 P-3, Yarbay
Rifat Sözüer, Sofular, ?, 1319 P-10, Yarbay
Hamdi, Karahisar, ?, 1319 P-4, Kolağası
M. Müştak, Van, ?, ?, Binbaşı (KIA)
Şakir Nimet, Aleppo, 1319 Sv-2, Yarbay
Şefik Avni Özüdoğru, Samsun, 1886, 1319 İs-1, Yarbay
Mustafa İsmet İnönü, Izmir, 1884, 1319 Top-1, Orgeneral ?
İzzettin Çalışlar, Yanya, ?, Top-2, Orgeneral
Mehmet Refik, Crete, ?, 1319 Ağ.Top-1, Yarbay
Vecihi, Kütahya, ?, 1319 P-7, Binbaşı
Abdurrahman Sami, Yanya, ?, 1319 P-32, Kolağası
Ali Nuri Okday, Constantinople, 1883, 1318 Sv-1, Binbaşı
İsmail Hakkı Okday, Constantinople, 1881, 1318 Sv-15, Yarbay

Distinguished (mümtaz) officers
Murat Nihat, Selânik, ?, ?, Yüzbaşı
Şakir Güleş, Kırklareli, 1319 P-20, Tümgeneral
Mustafa Nesimi, Crete, ?, 1319 P-14, Yarbay
Abdülkadir, Antep, ?, 1319 P-33, Yüzbaşı
Halit, Homus, ?, 1319 P-15, Binbaşı
Hüseyin Hüsnü, Gümülcine, ?, 1319 P-22, Tuğgeneral
Celâl, Arbil, ?, 1319 P-30, Yüzbaşı (KIA)
Nuri, Urfa, ?, 1319 P-12, Yarbay
Ali Naki Akman, Rodovişte, ?, ?, Binbaşı
Süleyman Sırrı, Üsküp, 1319 P-53 ?, Binbaşı
Ahmet Fuat, Baghdad, ?, 1319 P-53 ?, Binbaşı
Tevfik, Crete, ?, 1319 P-9, Binbaşı
Ali Kemal, Debre, ?, 1319 P-9, Binbaşı
Abdurrahman Nafiz Gürman, Akhisar, 1882, 1319 P-5, Orgeneral
İsmail Hakkı, Karahisar, ?, 1319 P-6, Albay
Mehmet Sait, Damascus, ?, 1319 P-35, Yüzbaşı (KIA)
M. Aşir Atlı, Kilis, ?, 1319 P-23, Tümgeneral
Muhittin Nuri, Damascus, ?, 1319 P-17, Binbaşı
Mahmut Refik, Damascus, ?, 1319 P-16, Binbaşı
Hayri, Yenişehir, ?, 1319 P-45, Albay
Mehmet Cemil, Damascus, ?, 1319 P-18, Binbaşı
Celâl, Çeşme, ?, 1319 P-20, Binbaşı
Mehmet Lütfi, Lazkiye, ?, 1319 P-28, Yarbay
Mehmet Emin, Aksaray, ?, 1319 P-36, Yarbay
Lütfi, Yenibahçe, ?, 1319 P-11, Kolağası (KIA)
Ahmet Ata, Kasımpaşa, ?, 1319 P-34, Binbaşı
Mahmut Sami, Damascus, ?, 1319 P-21, Binbaşı
Mehmet Hüsnü, Trablusşam, ?, 1319 P-29, Binbaşı
Remzi, Izmir, ?, 1319 P-27, Yarbay

60th class (graduated on September 20, 1907)

Staff (kurmay) officers
Yusuf, Damascus, ?, ?, ?
M. Kâzım Orbay, Izmir, 1886, 1320 Top-1, Orgeneral
Ahmet Naci Tınaz, Serfice, ?, 1320 P-3, Korgeneral
Hüseyin Hüsnü Emir Erkilet, Kadırga, ?, 1320 P-5, Tümgeneral
Kemal, Bursa, ?, 1320 P-9, Kolağası
Keramettin Kocaman, Davutpaşa, ?, 1320 Top-2, Korgeneral
Esat Faik, Debre, 1320 P-15, Yarbay (KIA)
Osman Zati Koral, Izmir, ?, 1320 Ağ.Top-1, Tümgeneral
Tahir, Yanya, ?, 1320 P-31, Albay
Ali Rıza, Kudüs, ?, ?, Binbaşı
Nevres, Crete, ?, ?, Kolağası

Distinguished (mümtaz) officers
İbrahim Lütfü Karapınar, Sivas, ?, ?, Tümgeneral
Ahmet Sabri, Damascus, ?, 1320 P-18, Binbaşı
Ahmet Fikri, Filibe, ?, 1320 P-4, Yüzbaşı
Burhanettin Denker, Kırrklareli, ?, 1320 P-28, Tümgeneral
Bekir Sıtkı, Crimea, ?, 1320 P-13, Albay
Hasan Tahsin, Serez, ?, 1320 P-30, Yarbay
Rıza, Firuzağa, ?, 1320 P-6, Yarbay
Hüseyin Hüsnü Kılkış, Kılkış, 1320 P-40, Korgeneral
Hayrullah Fişek, Kalkandelen, 1320 P-7, Tümgeneral
Sami, Constantinople, ?, ?, ?
Yusuf İzzet, Çanakkale, ?, 1320 P-26, Binbaşı
Alâeddin, Damascus, ?, 1320 P-16, Binbaşı
Ali Rıza Artunkal, ?, Filibe, 1320 P-34, Korgeneral
Fuat, Mudanya, ?, ?, Yüzbaşı
Kemal, Hafızpaşa, ?, 1320 P-25, Albay
M. Hayrullah, İşkodra, ?, ?, ?
Mehmet Zihni, Trebizond, ?, ?, ?
R. Rüştü, Hayzar, ?, 1320 P-24, Yüzbaşı (KIA)
Mahmut Ruhi, Erzurum, ?, 1320 P-19, Binbaşı 
Naim Cevat, Kırkkilise, 1320 P-31, Binbaşı
Ahmet Tahir, Constantinople, ?, ?, Binbaşı
Yasin, Damascus, 1320 P-14, Kolağası

61st class (graduated on August 24, 1908)

Staff (kurmay) officers
Muhittin, Kasımpaşa, ?, 1321 P-7, Binbaşı
Ahmet Suphi, Damascus, ?, 1320 P-1, Binbaşı
Kemalettin Sami, Sinop, 1321 P-2, Korgeneral (ambassador)
Hüsrev Gerede, Herzegovina, 1321 P-5, Yarbay (ambassador)
Abdülhamit, Baghdad, ?, ?, Binbaşı
Ali Rıza, Cerrahpaşa, ?, 1321 P-1, Binbaşı
Hasan Basri Saran, Şumnu, 1885, 1321 P-8, Korgeneral
Hayri, Damascus, ?, 1320 P-8, Yüzbaşı (KIA)
Ahmet Nuri, Sultanahmet, ?, 1321 İs-8, Yarbay
Ali Galip Türker, Usturmaca, ?, 1321 P-13, Korgeneral
Hüseyin Remzi, Eskişehir, ?, ?, Yüzbaşı (KIA)
Mehmet, Damascus, ?, 1321 P-11, Yüzbaşı

Distinguished (mümtaz) officers
İbrahim Beken, Gemlik, 1883, 1321 P-10, Tümgeneral
Ahmet Zeki Soydemir, Selânik, 1321 P-15, Tümgeneral
Ahmet Fatin, Sinop, ?, 1321 P-3, Albay
Ahmet Naci, İştip, ?, 1321 P-8, Yüzbaşı
Bekir Fikri, Elazığ, ?, ?, Yüzbaşı
Tahsin, Yusufpaşa, ?, 1321 P-22, Binbaşı (KIA)
Sabit Noyan, Çarşamba, 1321 P-30, Orgeneral
Cemal, Izmir, ?, 1321 P-29, Binbaşı
Cemal, Manisa, ?, ?, Yarbay
Hasan, Feriköy, 1321 P-14, Binbaşı
Cemil, Kartal, ?, ?, Yüzbaşı
Hasan, Kerkük, ?, 1321 P-28, Albay
Hüseyin Yahya, Damascus, 1321 P-24, ?
Hüseyin Hüsnü, Elbasan, 1321 P-25, Yüzbaşı (KIA)
Hüseyin Hüsnü, Köprülü, 1321 P-38, Albay
Hüseyin Avni Uler, Constantinople, ?, ?, Tümgeneral
Hakkı Muhlis Hasa, Adrianople (now Edirne), ?, 1321 P-21, Binbaşı
Sami, Aleppo, ?, ?, Binbaşı
Şemsettin, Uluborlu, 1323 P-34, Binbaşı
Arif, Damascus, ?, ?, Binbaşı
Osman Nuri, Çerkeş, ?, ?, YÜzbaşı
Ferit, Damascus, ?, 1321 Sv-1, Binbaşı
Mehmet Hamdi, Trablusgarp, 1321–31, Binbaşı
Mehmet Ali, Amtalua, ?, ?, ?
Mehmet Ali, Damascus, 1321 P-27, Yüzbaşı
Mehmet Fahri, Elazığ, 1321 P-9, Albay
Mehmet Sabri Ertuğ, Elazığ, 1321 P-12, Tuğgeneral

62nd class (graduated on August 26, 1909)

Staff (kurmay) officers
Mümtaz Aktay, Sultanahmet, ?, 1322 P-1, Korgeneral 
Taha, Baghdad, 1888, 1322 P-20, Yarbay
Osman Neceti, Cihangir, ?, ?, Binbaşı
Sami, Gebze, ?, 1322 P-8, Yüzbaşı (KIA)
Hasan Rıfat Mataracı, Bosnia, ?, 1322 P-5, Korgeneral
Rüştü Akın, Filibe, ?, 1322 P-15, Korgeneral
Şefik, Van, ?, 1322 P-4, Binbaşı
Abdülmecit Sakmar, Bursa, 1322 P-13, Albay
Halit Hüseyin Daday, Kastamonu, 1884, 1322 Top-2, Albay

Distinguished (mümtaz) officers
Yusuf Ziya Kayan, Pleveze, 1883, 1322 P-21, Albay
Mehmet Ağustos, Ağustos, ?, 1322 P-3, Albay
Ahmet Derviş, Yenice-i Vardar, ?, 1322 P-26, Korgeneral
Ahmet Fevzi Akarçay, Tikveş, ?, 1322 P-17, Tümgeneral
Yusuf Kâmil, Diyarbakır, ?, 1322-12, Albay
Yusuf Kenan, Monastir, ?, ?, Yüzbaşı (KIA)
Hasan Adil, Constantinople, ?, 1322 P-23, Binbaşı
Nazif, Baghdad, ?, 1322 P-22, Yüzbaşı
Halil Zeki, Kerkük, ?, ?, Yüzbaşı
Ali Remzi Yiğitgüden, Crete, ?, 1322 Top-1, Tümgeneral
Mahmut Nedim, Malatya, ?, 1318 P-91, Yarbay
Veysel Ünüvar, Erzincan, ?, ?, Tümgeneral
Süleyman Rasim, Aydın, ?, 1322 P-10, Yarbay
Halil Cevdet Sepicioğlu, Etyemez, 1322 P-6, Albay 
Ahmet Refik, Damascus, 1322 Sv-1, Yüzbaşı (KIA)
Ömer Basim, Aleppo, 1322 P-16, Yüzbaşı

63rd class (graduated on August 13, 1910)

Staff (kurmay) officers
Salih Omurtak, Sofular, 1889, 1323 P-1, Orgeneral
M. Saffet Arıkan, Erzincan, 1887, 1323 P-2, Albay
Mehmet Şerif, Damascus, 1887, 1323 Sv-2, Binbaşı
Yusuf, Beşiktaş, ?, 1323 Top-1, ?
Mehmet Şevki, İspir, 1885, 1323 P-5, Yüzbaşı
Ismail Hakkı Berkok, Gengelköy, 1885, 1323 P-6, Tuğgeneral
Mehmet Nazım, Tophane, 1887, 1323 P-3, Yarbay (KIA)
Hüseyin Hayrettin, Constantinople, 1889, 1323 P-11, Yüzbaşı
Mahmut Hamdi, Selânik, ?, 1322 P-14, Yüzbaşı (KIA)
Mehmet Nahit, Kantarcılar, 1888, 1323 P-30, Yüzbaşı (KIA)
Bahaettin, Manastır, 1883, 1323 P-18, Yüzbaşı

Distinguished (mümtaz) officers
Mehmet Sabri Beşe, 1885, 1323 P-17, Tümgeneral
Hamza, Rize, 1886, 1323 P-383, Yüzbaşı (KIA)
Yusuf Ziya Ekinci, Erzurum, 1886, Top-3, Tümgeneral
Ali Hamit Doğruer, Scutari (Üsküdar), 1887, 1323 Sv-1, Tuğgeneral
Ahmet Tevfik, Dir, 1886, 1323 P-4, Yüzbaşı (KIA)
Rüştü Akpirim, Babahaydar, 1886, 1323 P-27, Albay
İzzet, Yanya, 1884, 1323 P-8, Yüzbaşı (KIA)
Şevket, Tırnova, 1885, 1323 P-15, ?
Mustafa, Damascus, 1885, 1323 Sv-33, Yüzbaşı (KIA)
Tahir, Yeşiltulumba, 1886, 1323 P-27, Binbaşı (KIA)
Mehmet Selim, Damascus, 1890, 1323 Top-25, Binbaşı
İbrahim, Crete, 1884, 1323 P-19, Albay
Hüseyin, Beşiktaş, 1885, 1323 P-16, Yüzbaşı (KIA)
Mehmet Selâhattin, Aleppo, 1890, 1323 P-23, Albay
Hüseyin, Küçükpazar, 1885, 1323 P-12, Yüzbaşı
Nurettin, Aksaray, 1887, 1323 P-22, Yüzbaşı (KIA)
Tahir, Keşan, 1884, 1323 P-28, Yüzbaşı
Ali Rıza, Trabzon, 1884, 1323 Sv-6, Yarbay
Tacettin, Hanya, 1885, 1323 P-28, Yüzbaşı (KIA)
Adil Türer, Izmir, 1886, 1322 Kale Top-2
Cemil, Trablus, ?, 1323 P-33, Yüzbaşı (KIA)
Selim Şerif, Damascus, 1884, ?, ?

64th class (graduated on July 28, 1912)

Staff (kurmay) officers
Refet Bele, Selânik, 1881, 1314 P-19, Mirliva
Mustafa Edip, Adapazarı, 1881, 1314 P-29, Miralay
Mehmet Kenan Dalbaşar, Yani Kaldırım, 1885, 1318 Sv-7, Korgeneral
Mesut, Çankırı, 1882, 1320 P-1, Yüzbaşı (KIA)
Mehmet Nihat, Bursa, 1885, 1321 P-6, Yarbay
Ahmet Vefik, Van, 1882, 1318 Sv-13, Yüzbaşı (KIA)
Sait, Selânik, 1880, 1320 P-32, Binbaşı
İsmail Hakkı Tümerdem, Eyüp, 1881, 1320 P-64, Albay
Kemal, Çemberlitaş, 1888, 1323 İs-5, Yüzbaşı (KIA) 
M. Kâzım Dirik, Manastır, 1879, 1315 P-5, Mirliva (governor)
Tevfik, Aleppo, 1883, 1319 P-52, Binbaşı
Ahmet Nihat, Constantinople, 1882, 1317 P-37, Albay

Distinguished (mümtaz) officers
Mehmet İhsan Hün, Yenice-i Vardar, 1321 P-50, Albay
Cemal, Aksaray, 1880, 1317 P-90, Binbaşı (KIA)
Sait, Constantinople, 1880, 1314 P-64, Binbaşı (governor)
Kenan, İzmit, 1879, 1317 P-177, Albay
Hasan Tahsin, Angora (now Ankara), 1879, 1318 P-61, Binbaşı (KIA)
Yusuf Kemal, Erzurum, 1883, 1318 P-144, Binbaşı
Hikmet, Şehremini, 1881, 1318 Sv-8, Binbaşı
Saffet, Davutpaşa, 1880, 1318 Sv-6, Yarbay

65th class (graduated on July 28, 1914)

Staff (kurmay) officers
M. Tevfik Bıyıkoğlu, Çanakkale, 1889, 1324 Top-2, Albay
M. Celâlettin Germeyanoğlu, Nişantaş, 1889, 1324 P-319, Binbaşı
Hüseyin Rahmi Apak, Babaeski, 1887, 1323 P-28, Albay
Muzaffer Ergüder, Bursa, 1886, 1319 P-37, Orgeneral
Cevdet, Adrianople, 1885, 1324 P-5, Yüzbaşı (KIA)
Ahmet Temiz, Şumnu, 1887, 1324 Top-1, Yüzbaşı
Bekir Sıtkı, Baghdad, 1890, ?, ?
Osman Yümnü, Constantinople, 1888, 1320 Sv-2, Binbaşı
Yusuf Ziya Yazgan, Cisri Mustafa Paşa, 1888, 1324 P-16, Tümgeneral
Mahmut Nedim, Caucasus, 1880, 1316 Sv-484, Yarbay (KIA)
Ali Enver, Florina, 1887, 1324 P-78, Binbaşı (KIA)
Yakup, Erzincan, 1885, ?, Yüzbaşı (KIA)
Reşat, Constantinople, 1883, 1317 P-73, Albay
Şemsettin Erkuş, Rumkale, 1889, 1324 P-7, Albay
Mehmet Neşet, Manastır, 1888, 1324 Sv-32, Albay
Mehmet Tarık, Sudan, 1887, 1324 Sv-1, Yüzbaşı
Mehmet Faik Sütünne, Sultanselim, 1884, 1320 P-60, Tümgeneral
Ahmet Nüzhet, Kilis, 1888, 1324 P-8, Binbaşı

Distinguished (mümtaz) officers
Muzaffer Şakir, Tophane, 1889, 1324 P-80, Yüzbaşı
Mehmet Nuri, Harput, 1881, 1318 P-58, Binbaşı (KIA)
M. Mazlumi İskora, Kalkandelen, 1324 P-53, Orgeneral
Ömer, Şumnu, 1881, 1320 P-61, Binbaşı
Muhittin, Damascus, 1887, 1322 P-35, Yüzbaşı
Ömer Halis Bıyıktay, Erzincan, 1884, 1321 P-44, Korgeneral
Mustafa, Damascus, 1888, 1321 P-78, Yüzbaşı

66th class (graduated on October 4, 1919)
M. Recep Peker, Constantinople, 1889, 1323 P-44, Yarbay
Bâki Vandemir, Sultanahmet, 1889, 1324 Sv-3, Orgeneral
Ali Germeyanoğlu, Constantinople, 1889, 1324 P-320, Yüzbaşı
Mustafa Şevki, Kalkandelen, 1889, 1324 P-20, Yarbay
Mehmet Ziya, Sivas, 1888, 1324 P-8, Binbaşı
Seyfettin Akkoç, Bitlis, 1320 P-122, Tümgeneral
Hasan Tahsin, Konya, 1884, 1322 P-44, Yarbay
Ali Rıza Erem, Beşiktaş, 1887, 1324 P-1, Yarbay
İshak Avni Akdağ, Harput, 1889, 1324 P-11, Orgeneral 
M. Ferit, Şam, 1889, 1324 P-54, Yüzbaşı
M. Kadri Musluoğlu, Aksaray, 1889, 1324 P-9, Yüzbaşı
Talât, Sultanahmet, 1888, 1324 P-1, Binbaşı
Yakup Sami, Kayseri, 1887, 1324 P-11, Yüzbaşı (KIA)
Faik Sözer, Selânik, 1885, 1324 P-2, Yarbay
Ali Rıza, Aksaray, 1884, 1321 P-91, Albay
Hasan İskender, Manastır, 1885, 1324 Sv-22, Binbaşı
Faik, Serez, 1881, 1319 P-46, Binbaşı

67th class (graduated on July 6, 1920)
Tahsin Alagöz, Isprata, 1884, 1321 P-26, Yarbay
Mustafa Cemil Taner, Uzunköprü, 1892, 1325 P-42, Tümgeneral
Mehmet Salih Erkuş, Rumkale, 1886, 1324 Sv-6, Tümgeneral
Şemsettin Taner, Uzunköprü, 1890, 1325 Sv-2, Korgeneral
Necmettin, Edirne, 1890, 1325 Sv-16, Üsteğmen
Mehmet Nuri Yamut, Selânik, 1890, 1324 P-27, Orgeneral
Ahmet Mithat, Sarıgez, 1888, 1325 P-11, Binbaşı
İsmail Hakkı Kurtcebe Noyan, Sivas, 1888, 1325 P-6, Orgeneral
Mustafa Kemal Gökçe, Erzincan, 1889, 1325 P-354, Tümgeneral
Mehmet Şükrü Ögel, Sarıgez, 1888, 1325 P-28, Albay
Mehmet Şükrü Koçak, Elazığ, 1885, 1321 Sv-3, Yarbay
Mehmet Kemalettin, Çengelköy, 1885, 1323 J-31, Albay
Halil, Manastır, 1889, 1325 P-12, Yüzbaşı
İ. Kemal Baybora, Bayburt, 1890, 1325 Sv-4, Yarbay
Recep Ferdi Süalp, Edirne, 1887, 1324 P-10, Tümgeneral
Ali Haydar, Elazığ, 1888, 1324 P-66, Binbaşı (KIA)
Cevat Karsan, Fethiye, 1885, 1321 P-169, Albay
Hayri, Büyükdere, 1887, 1325 P-185, Yüzbaşı
Nebil, Constantinople, 1887, ?, Yüzbaşı
İsmail Ekrem Baydar, Constantinople, 1886, 1321 Top-3, Korgeneral

Education  
 Education in the Ottoman Empire

References

External links
"History of Education" in the official website of the Turkish War Colleges Command.
"Harp Akd. Komutanlığı'ndan Mezun Komutan ve Devlet Büyükleri" in the official website of the Turkish War Colleges Command. 

 
Staff colleges
1848 establishments in the Ottoman Empire